Yurchi may refer to:
 Yurchi, East Azerbaijan
 Yurchi-ye Gharbi Rural District, in Ardabil Province
 Yurchi-ye Sharqi Rural District, in Ardabil Province